Team Centric (formerly Team Xtra Personell) was the first professional private cross country team in Norway. It was created in 2007. In the 2012–2013 season the team consists of the skiers Anders Aukland, Jørgen Aukland, Jerry Ahrlin, Simen Østensen and Stanislav Řezáč. The team participate mainly in the international long distance cross country cup Ski Classics.

Team Xtra Personell won Ski Classics team overall competition both in 2011 and 2012. Anders Aukland won the men's overall cup in 2012. Simen Østensen competed in Tour de Ski in the 2012–2013 season.

Since autumn 2013 the team is named Team Centric due to the team's main sponsor Xtra Personell being merged with the company Centric.

https://web.archive.org/web/20140106172703/http://www.teamcentric.org/

Cross-country skiing